Andalusian cuisine is the cuisine of Andalusia, Spain.  Notable dishes include gazpacho, fried fish (often called pescaíto frito in the local vernacular), the jamones of Jabugo, Valle de los Pedroches and Trevélez, and the wines of Jerez, particularly sherry. The oldest known cookbook of Andalusian cuisine dates from the 14th century.

Fried foods

Frying in Andalusian cuisine is dominated by the use of olive oil that is produced in the provinces of Jaén, Córdoba, Seville, and Granada. Málaga, Almería, Cádiz and Huelva produce olive oil too, but in smaller amounts.
The foods are dredged in flour a la Andaluza (meaning only flour, without egg or other ingredients, but may include flour from the chickpea especially for use in batters).  They are then fried in a large quantity of hot olive oil.

Fish and shellfish

With five coastal provinces, the consumption of fish and shellfish is rather high: white shrimp from the Bay of Cádiz; prawns; murex; anchovies; baby squid; cuttlefish; "bocas de la Isla", a dish found in San Fernando that uses a local crab that can regenerate its claw; flounder; etc.

Andalucian cuisine includes also some less frequently seen seafood dishes, like ortiguillas, sea anemones in batter.

Desserts

Sugar was first introduced to Andalusia by the Moors around the 10th-century and cultivated in Granada.

Andalucian desserts are heavily influenced by Arabic medieval Andalucian cuisine. Notable dishes include pestiños (a deep-fried pastry bathed in honey),  (a form of almond macaroon) from Medina Sidonia, polvorones (almond cookies of Estepa), lard bread, wine doughnuts,  and calentitos.

Wines and liquors

The wines of Jerez (also known as sherry) are famous the world over, praised even by William Shakespeare. Other standouts are the manzanilla of Sanlúcar de Barrameda, the white wines of Cádiz, paxarete (a sherry derivative), wines of Condado in Huelva, wines of Montilla-Moriles in Córdoba, wines of Málaga, and la tintilla of Rota. The liquors of the region are also popular, included the anís made in Rute, and in Cazalla de la Sierra, and the rums from the Tropical Coast of Granada (Motril).

Typical dishes

Typical Andalucian dishes include pescaito frito (fried fish), gazpacho, Cordoban salmorejo, pringá, oxtail, jamón ibérico (Iberian ham), prepared olives, alboronía, poleá, anise, and various kinds of wine, including sherries (fino, manzanilla, oloroso, Pedro Ximénez, amontillado) which are undoubtedly the most exported and most widely available of all Spanish wines, as well as Málaga wine. The wine from Montilla, while similar to sherry, is not technically a sherry, but gives its name to amontillado, meaning "in the style of Montilla".

Some other Andalucian dishes include:

 Salmorejo (Córdoba)
 Flamenquín (Córdoba)
 Ajoblanco (Málaga-Cádiz)
 Gazpacho andaluz (Andalucian gazpacho)
 Pipirrana (Jaén)
 Habas con calzones
 Huevos a la flamenca
 Alcauciles rellenos (Cádiz)
 Migas de harina
 Gachas
 Olla gitana
 Puchero
 Gazpachuelo (Málaga)
 Biénmesabe o adobo
 Ajo harina (Jaén)
 Soldaditos de Pavía
 Pringá
 Patatas a lo pobre
 Tortilla de patatas
 Tortillitas de camarones (Cádiz)
 Pinchitos

See also 
 Tapas

References

External links
Gastronomía Andaluza en Tertulia Andaluza
Andalusian recipes 
Andalusian cookbook - English translation